The Horizon League is a high school athletic league that is part of the CIF Southern Section. Members are all-girls Roman Catholic college preparatory schools located western San Gabriel Valley, Glendale, mid-city and Lincoln Heights neighborhoods of Los Angeles.

Members
 Alverno Heights Academy (Sierra Madre)
 Bishop Conaty-Our Lady of Loretto High School (Los Angeles)
 Holy Family High School (Glendale)
 Ramona Convent Secondary School (Alhambra)
 Sacred Heart of Jesus High School (Lincoln Heights)
 San Gabriel Mission High School

References

CIF Southern Section leagues